Woodhouse Grove School ('The Grove') is a private, co-educational,  day and boarding public school and Sixth Form. it is located to the north of Apperley Bridge, West Yorkshire, England (Apperley Bridge is located in the City of Bradford, however the school is located just over the municipal border in the City of Leeds). The school, and its preparatory junior school, Brontë House, is located in the Aire Valley.  There are approximately 1,000 students on roll, currently including around 90 boarders.

The school was founded as an all-boys boarding preparatory institution, for the sons of Methodist Ministers. It developed over the latter part of the 20th century. Woodhouse Grove has evolved into an independent education centre, providing education from the age of three through to graduation from the sixth form.

Although a Christian school, Woodhouse Grove accepts children from other religions or children with no declared religious affiliations. The school offers academic and sixth form scholarships, bursaries for HM Forces families, clergy families and sixth form, music awards, sport awards and financial assistance for siblings.

Location
The school benefits from the Apperley Bridge railway station, opened in 2015, which is located just across the road from the school's chapel.

History

Early plans
Kingswood School, near Bath, in the West Country, served as the sole Methodist school from 1748, but was inconvenient for northern residents. The topic was raised at Conference in 1781 and John Wesley replied, "Probably we may (provide such a school). Let our brethren think of a place and a master and send me word". Adam Clarke returned to the subject at the 1806 conference, in his first year as conference president. Over the next five years possible sites were examined.

The Grove
With the purchase at Woodhouse Grove in Apperley, near Bradford, the decision to found the school was made by ballot at the Wesleyan Conference of 1811, still under Clarke. It initially provided an education for the sons of the itinerant ministers in service of the Wesleyan Methodist Church in the north of England. The original name, The Wesleyan Academy, as evidenced by a commemorative wall plaque at the school, did not catch on.

Few alterations were needed to convert the house for use as a school, but the barn was cleaned up as a schoolroom and the stables converted as a chapel. The drawing room became a lecture and study room and thirty wooden cribs (or cots) were provided for the boys to sleep on. The school opened on 8 January 1812 under the headship of John Fennell as first master and with an initial roll of twenty seven pupils.

For much of the 19th century, between 1812 and 1875, Woodhouse Grove and Kingswood operated as separate schools for children aged between eight and fifteen years old, with both schools under direct control of conference. The school also had a local management committee and there were frequent conflicts with conference over duplicated but differing decisions relating to teacher selection, staff salaries and building expansion needs. Between 1875 and 1883, the two schools were combined as a single school, despite the problems caused by being two hundred miles apart. The Grove served as a preparatory school with pupils then relocating at the age of thirteen to the upper school at Kingswood.

The school was refounded on 21 September 1883, the "New Foundation Day", to admit boys from a wider spectrum of backgrounds. The Grove received its first pupils as a Methodist middle class boarding and day school under a new policy laid down by the Wesleyan Conference. The sermon on the New Foundation Day was given by the Reverend Robert Newton Young, himself a former pupil of the school between 1837 and 1843, and the sermon was based around the text “Bone et Fidelis” or “Good and Faithful” which was to become the new school motto to the present day.

By the summer term of 1884, the school roll had expanded to 155 pupils. During the Second World War, and under direct grant funding after the 1944 Education Act, the school expanded, with boarding pupils placed and paid for by London County Council and the East Riding of Yorkshire authority.

Traditionally a school for boys only, the school first admitted girls to the sixth form in 1979 and has been fully co-educational since 1985. The school has continued to expand since its origins, adding modern  buildings as required almost continuously over its existence.

Brontë House
For several years, HM Inspector of Schools had recommended that Woodhouse Grove make better provision for younger pupils. Under the guidance of the Secretary of the Methodist Education Committee, Rev. H. B. Workman, the preparatory school at Brontë House was founded in 1934 as a junior preparatory school for five- to eleven-year-old boys. The school became a coeducational establishment in 1985.

The school stands in the grounds of a former private residence called Ashdown House and was originally known as 'Woodhouse Grove Preparatory School'. Ashdown House stood in the grounds of an older mansion known as Upperwood House where Charlotte Brontë was once governess to the White family's two children. The first master of the new school was Dr F.C. Pritchard, MA, who later wrote the 1978 history of the school and its development. Charlotte Brontë's father, the Reverend Patrick Brontë, had met Maria, his wife to be, while visiting his friend, John Fennell, who became the first headmaster of the Grove in the early 19th century.

Initially, Brontë House had no kitchen facility of its own and the children were escorted back and forth in all weathers to the Grove for their lunches and dinner. Later, a small car was bought by the school to ferry prepared meals from the main school kitchen to Brontë House,  until a proper kitchen was built several years later. A boarding facility is provided for pupils.

Ashdown Lodge
Ashdown Lodge opened in September 1993, as the Early Years Department of Woodhouse Grove, providing continuity of education from three to eighteen years of age.

Current school
The school has three parts:

Ashdown Lodge (Nursery) — for pre-school children aged between three and five.
Brontë House (Junior) — for children aged between five and eleven.
 

Woodhouse Grove (Secondary and sixth form) — has facilities that include a sports and performing arts complex, and boarding accommodation.

The school has good examination results.

The Sports Hall and theatre complex was built in 2003, followed by a Music and Performing Arts centre in 2009. A 25m competition pool Jubilee Swimming pool was completed at the time of the school's 200th year founding anniversary.

Boarding
Boarding arrangements are occasional, weekly or full. Boarding accommodation consists of two houses: Brodwell House for boys, which was purpose-built in 2006, and Miller House for girls in the old part of the school.

Notable staff
Former Manchester United Footballer and Yorkshire and England cricketer, Arnie Sidebottom, was a cricket coach at the Grove. and Joe Bedford, former Leeds Carnegie rugby player coming from the junior school Brontë house.

Notable alumni

The Old Grovian Association currently has 3,600 members from previous students and staff. Notable alumni include:

 Sir Albert Newby Braithwaite  DSO (2 September 1893 – 20 October 1959) was a British Conservative Party politician.
 John William Draper (1811–1882), chemist, botanist, historian and photographer
 Anna Fitzpatrick (1989– ), tennis player
 George Leslie "Les" Grainge (1910–1983), rugby league footballer of the 1930s for England, and Bradford Northern
 John Anderson Hartley (1844–1896), educationist
 John Hillaby (1917–1996), travel writer
 Thomas Hocken (1836–1910), collector, bibliographer and researcher
 Nick Houghton (1954– ), General Sir John Nicholas Reynolds Houghton KCB, CBE was the Chief of the Defence Staff of the British Armed Forces (2013–2016).
 John Lockwood Kipling (1837–1911), illustrator, museum curator
Peter Brierley Johnson (1925–2016) correspondent reuters, BBC
 Kathryn Leng (1985–), cricketer
 Herbert Edward Palmer (1880–1961), poet
 George Northcroft (1885–1943), British Orthodontist
 William Mabane, 1st Baron Mabane (1895–1969), Liberal politician, held office as Assistant Postmaster-General and Minister of State for Foreign Affairs.
 Uzair Mahomed (1987–), cricketer
 Katie O'Brien (1986– ), tennis player
 Naomi Broady (1990– ), tennis player
 John Poulson (1910–1993), Architect
 George Scott Railton (1849–1913) Leader of The Salvation Army with William Booth, and father of David Railton and grand father of Dame Ruth Railton
 Samuel Evans Rowe (1834–1897), Methodist missionary to South Africa
 Phil Bentley CEO Mitie Plc (1959- ) 
 Paul Sampson (1977– ), rugby player
 Andrew Smith (1977- ),  Former Lord Mayor of Westminster  
 Dan Scarbrough (1978– ), rugby player
 Ajmal Shahzad (1985– ), cricketer
 Joe Bedford (1984– ), rugby player
 Eni Gesinde (1982– ), rugby player
Noel Stockdale (1920–2004), businessman and co-founder of Asda
 Edward Sugden (1854–1935), Methodist and first master of Queen's College (University of Melbourne)
 Michael Walker (1944– ), now Baron Walker of Aldringhan, was Chief of the Defence Staff (CDS) in the United Kingdom from May 2003 until April 2006.
 Aasif Mandvi (1966– ) Actor
 Jessica Knappett (1984– ) Writer and actor

See also
Listed buildings in Guiseley and Rawdon

References

External links 
Woodhouse Grove School
D'Arch's Guide to UK Boarding Schools

Private schools in Leeds
Boarding schools in West Yorkshire
Member schools of the Headmasters' and Headmistresses' Conference
Educational institutions established in 1812

Preparatory schools in West Yorkshire
Methodist schools in England
1812 establishments in England